Ira William Zartman is Professor Emeritus at the Paul H. Nitze School of Advanced International Studies (SAIS) of Johns Hopkins University.  He earlier directed the school's Conflict Management and African Studies programs. He holds the Jacob Blaustein Chair in International Organizations and Conflict Resolution. He is a founder and current Board Chairman of the International Peace and Security Institute (IPSI).

Bibliography

Books 
 Destiny of a Dynasty: The Search for Institutions in Morocco's Developing Society (1964)
 Collapsed States: The Disintegration and Restoration of Legitimate Authority (1995)
 Peacemaking in International Conflict (1997) Ed. United States Institute of Peace
 International Negotiation: Actors, Structure/Process, Values (1999)
 International Multilateral Negotiations; Approaches to the Management of Complexity (1999)
 Power and Negotiation (2000)
 Preventive Negotiation: Avoiding Conflict Escalation (2001)
 A Strategic Vision for Africa: The Kampala Movement (2002)
 Getting It Done: Post-Agreement Negotiation and International Regimes (2003)
 Rethinking the Economics of War: The Intersection of Need, Creed, and Greed (2005)

Critical studies and reviews of Zartman's work
Arab Spring

References

Living people
Year of birth missing (living people)
Johns Hopkins University faculty
Negotiation scholars
Scholars of diplomacy